The Kahl is a river in the northern Spessart in Bavaria and Hesse, Germany. The name Kahl comes from the Old High German word kaldaha, which means cool and clear. The Kahl rises from two sources left and right of the road at the foot of the Spessart hills, near Kleinkahl. These springs produce 50–60 litres per second. The Kahl flows into the river Main in Kahl am Main. The mouth is near the old Kahl Nuclear Power Plant. The largest tributaries are Westerbach, Sommerkahl, Reichenbach and Geiselbach.

Tributaries
Tributaries from source to mouth:

Left
 Büchelbach
 Edelbach
 Kleine Kahl
 Kleinlaudenbach
 Höllenbach
 Sommerkahl
 Blankenbach
 Erlenbach
 Feldkahl
 Weibersbach (not to be confused with the right tributary)
 Reichenbach
 Forstgraben
 Rappach
 Fleutersbach
 Hemsbach
 Hitziger Lochgraben
 Kertelbach
 Krebsbach 
 Neuwiesenbach

Right
 Lindenbach
 Habersbach
 Westerbach
 Krombach 
 Sterzenbach
 Schloßgrundgraben
 Oberschurbach
 Steinbach
 Geiselbach 
 Wolfsbach
 Weibersbach (not to be confused with the left tributary)
 Goldbach
 Streu
 Sälzerbach

See also 
List of rivers of Bavaria
List of rivers of Hesse

References 

Rivers of Bavaria
 
Rivers of the Spessart
Main-Kinzig-Kreis
Aschaffenburg (district)
Rivers of Germany
Rivers of Hesse